Shervon Jack (born 6 November 1986) is a Saint Lucian international football player who plays as a defender for Northern United All Stars in the Saint Lucia Gold Division. He previously played for Joe Public in the TT Pro League and for South East Castries in the Saint Lucia Gold Division.

Jack made his international debut for Saint Lucia starting against Turks and Caicos Islands in the 2–1 World Cup 2010 qualifier defeat on 6 February 2008. His second cap was against Turks and Caicos Islands again in the second leg of qualifying in the 2–0 victory, when he came on as a sub in the 89th minute on 26 March 2008.

References

External links

1986 births
Living people
Association football midfielders
Saint Lucian footballers
Saint Lucia international footballers
Saint Lucian expatriate footballers
Joe Public F.C. players
TT Pro League players
Expatriate footballers in Trinidad and Tobago
Saint Lucian expatriate sportspeople in Trinidad and Tobago
Vempers Sports Athletic Dramatic Club players